RTÉ News on Two was a late night news programme that aired each Monday to Thursday on Irish public service broadcaster RTÉ Two. The transmission time of this programme varied each night. It generally aired between 10:45pm and 11:30pm. It ran for 10 minutes. Until 4 January 2013, the programme was broadcast every Monday to Thursday, lasting 22 minutes. A world weather forecast followed each broadcast.

RTÉ News on Two took a different agenda to other RTÉ News and Current Affairs programmes. Its content was customised for a younger audience, and presenters and journalists tend to use more informal language on the programme. From 2 October 2006 the bulletin was presented by Eileen Whelan, following the departure of Anthony Murnane, who was with the programme from the beginning. Eamonn Falvey edited the programme from 2 April 2007 until December 2009. Gareth O'Connor was the programme editor until 2010. It was mainly presented by Eileen Whelan, Aengus Mac Grianna and Una O'Hagan.

Form 5 March 2007 until 18 September 2014, RTÉ News on Two was streamed live on the internet and archive shows are available to view through the RTÉ website. For the duration of the 2011 general election campaign, RTÉ News on Two in its regular format was only aired on Thursday night, with a reformatted programme, The Eleventh Hour, airing Monday-Wednesday (with a short RTÉ News on Two extended summary airing beforehand).

History
The programme began as Newsnight in 1978 and was broadcast at the end of programming during much of the RTÉ Two's first 10 years on the air. It was largely an international news service with reports from BBC News, ITN, ABC News, CBS and other American networks.

On 3 October 1988, RTÉ Two relaunched as Network 2 and their news programme was relaunched as Network News – it was a regular RTÉ News bulletin but the name reflected the name of the channel it was broadcast on.

In 1997, as part of RTÉ's revamp of Network 2 as "N2", the programme was completely changed and renamed News 2. News 2 was presented by Sharon Ní Bheoláin (who had presented Nuacht RTÉ for a number of years) and Anthony Murnane. Both presenters would present alternating weeks, with another presenter for the sports news. Unlike RTÉ News on RTÉ One News 2 was presented from a green screen studio, the presenters sat on high stools, the main news presenter would sit on the right while the sports presenter on the left at different desks.

In 2003, RTÉ began another rebranding exercise and choose to highlight what channels they own hence N2 was relaunched as RTÉ N2 (however continuity referred to the channel as RTÉ Network 2). The RTÉ Network 2 news programme was restored to the regular RTÉ News look and branding (as "RTÉ News on Two"), and now broadcasts from the regular RTÉ News studio, but many of the innovations of News 2 and the younger agenda remain. For example, the presenter usually stands to introduce the first story.

The series was replaced by two early evening bulletins called News Feed on 22 September 2014, which ran until January 2017.

A live late night news remains on both RTÉ One and RTÉ News Now on Fridays between September and May after The Late Late Show.

See also
Other RTÉ News and Current Affairs programmes include:

 RTÉ News: One O'Clock
 RTÉ News: Six One
 RTÉ News: Nine O'Clock

References

External links
RTÉ News on Two at RTÉ.ie

1978 Irish television series debuts
1970s Irish television series
1980s Irish television series
1990s Irish television series
2000s Irish television series
2010s Irish television series
Irish television news shows
RTÉ News and Current Affairs
RTÉ original programming

zh:RTÉ新聞二台